Imamzadeh Abdollah is a cemetery and one of many imamzadeh shrines in Iran. It is located in Tehran's southern Ray district.

Notable burials
Hossein-Qoli Khan Nezam os-Saltaneh (1832–1908) – Prime Minister of Iran (1906–07)
Agha Baba Khazeni (1850–1920)
Reza-Qoli Khan Nezam os-Saltaneh (fa) (1867–1924) – politician
Adib Pishavari (ur)  (1844–1930) – Pakistani scholar and poet
Javad Khan Saad od-Dowleh (1856–1930) – politician
Abdolhossein Teymourtash (1881—1933) – politician
Emad ol-Kottab (1868–1936) – calligrapher
Sheikh Khazal (1863–1936) – politician
Taqi Arani (1903–1940) – Marxist activist
Prince Mohammad-Hashem Mirza Sheikh ol-Raees (fa)  (1880–1940) – Qajar prince and poet
Ebrat Naeini (fa) (1865–1942) – poet
Vahid Dastgerdi (fa) (1879–1942) – poet
Taghi Shayegan (fa) (d. 1943) – musician
Soleiman Eskandari (1877–1944) – politician
Habibollah Zolfonoun (fa) (1860–1947) – scholar
Sohrab Diba (fa) (1899–1947) – army officer and father of Empress Farah Pahlavi
Abdolhossein Shahnazi (fa) (d. 1948) – musician
Mehdi Shariat-Razavi (fa) (1932–1953) – political activist
Ahmad Qandchi (fa) (1934–1953) – political activist
Mostafa Bozorgnia (fa) (1934–1953) – political activist
Ezzatollah Siamak (fa) (d. 1954) – a founder of Tudeh Military Network
Toghrol Afshar (fa) (1933–1956) – journalist
Abdollah Ahmadieh (fa) (1886–1959) – scholar
Abolfazl Lesani (fa) (1897–1959) – journalist
Nima Yooshij (1897–1960) – poet (in 1993, his body reburied in his house in Yush, Mazandaran)
Sadegh Sarmad (fa) (1907–1960) – politician
Asghar Tafakkori (fa) (1911–1960) – actor
Ali Nasr (1895–1961) – dramatist
Ahmad-Hossein Adl (1889–1963) – politician
Fazlollah Zahedi (1892–1963) – Prime Minister of Iran (1953–55)
Ahmad Amir-Ahmadi (1884–1965) – army general
Doust-Ali Moayyeri (fa) (1874–1966) – artist
Hossein Qollar-Aqasi (1890–1966) – painter
Iskandar Mirza (1899–1969) – 1st President of Pakistan
Ahmad Akhgar (fa) (1888–1970) – politician
Mehdi Bamdad (fa) (1897–1973) – historian and biographer
Nader Arasteh (de) (1893–1974) – diplomat
Jalal Afshar (fa) (1894–1974) – scholar
Abbas Masoudi (fa) (1895–1974) – journalist and politician
Mohammad Mehran (fa) (1898–1974) – mayor of Tehran
Azizollah Zarghami (fa) (1884–1978) – army general
Habibiollah Morad (fa) (1906–1978) – actor
Abdolali Badrei (1919–1979) – army general
Gholamhossein Zahireddini (fa) (1911–1981) – musician
Ali Dashti (1897–1982) – politician
Mahmoud Karimi (fa) (1927–1984) – musician
Ali-Akbar Shahnazi (1897–1985) – musician
Badr-ol-Moluk Bamdad (fa) (1898–1987) – journalist and activist
Reza Sarrafzadeh (fa) (1899–1987) – politician
Mohsen Moghaddam (fa) (1900–1987) – scholar
Mehdi Barkashli (fa) (1912–1988) – musician
Mohammad-Ali Safarian (fa) (1929–1988) – translator
Kazem Hassibi (1906–1990) – politician
Mohammad-Taghi Qomi (fa) (1910–1990) – cleric
Hassan Mirkhani (fa) (1912–1990) – calligrapher
Majid Mohseni (fa) (1923–1990) – actor
Hossein Amirfazli (fa) (1920–1992) – actor
Abbas Mehrpooya (fa) (1927–1992) – singer
Ali-Reza Afzalipour (1909–1993) – philanthropist
Abolhassan Varzi (fa) (1914–1994) – poet
Yadollah Sahabi (1906–2002) – politician
Fakhereh Saba (1920–2007) – singer
Jafar Shahidi (1919–2008) – scholar
Touran Mirhadi (1927–2016) – scholar
Pouran Shariat-Razavi (fa) (1934–2019) – scholar
Ali Mirzaei (1929–2020) – wrestler
Baktash Abtin (1974–2022) – writer

See also
 List of cemeteries in Iran
 Imamzadeh

Cemeteries in Tehran
Religious buildings and structures in Tehran
Ziyarat
Architecture in Iran